Kwararafa University  is located in Wukari,  Taraba State Nigeria.It was established in 2005 and is recognized by National Universities Commission.

Courses offered  
Kwararafa University is operating three (3) colleges, each college has courses that are accredited to it.

Below are the courses based on the college they belong to:

COLLEGE OF MANAGEMENT AND SOCIAL SCIENCES:

 B.Sc Accounting
 B.Sc Economics
 B.Sc Business Administration
 Sc Political Science and International Relations,
 B.Sc Public Administration
 B.Sc Sociology
 B.Sc Criminology and Security Studies
 B.Sc Mass Communication
 B.Sc Geography

COLLEGE OF NATURAL AND APPLIED SCIENCE: 

 B.Sc Biology
 B.Sc Computer Science
 B.Sc Statistics

COLLEGE OF EDUCATION: 

 B.Ed Educational Management
 B.Ed Guidance and Counselling
 B.Ed Human Kinetics and Health Education

References

External links

 
2005 establishments in Nigeria
Educational institutions established in 2005
Private universities and colleges in Nigeria
Taraba State